"Crazy" is a song co-written and recorded by American Country music superstar Kenny Rogers. It was released in December 1984 as the second single from his 1984 album What About Me?, following the title song.

This was Rogers' eleventh number one Country single as a solo artist.  The single spent a total of thirteen weeks in the Country chart's Top 40. It also made the Top Five of Billboard's Adult Contemporary survey. Rogers co-wrote the track with Richard Marx, who was serving as a session musician and background vocalist for Rogers.

Charts

Weekly charts

Year-end charts

References

1984 singles
1984 songs
Kenny Rogers songs
Songs written by Richard Marx
Songs written by Kenny Rogers
Song recordings produced by David Foster
RCA Records singles